The 2002 Likud leadership election was held on 28 November 2002 to elect the leader of the Likud party. Incumbent prime minister and party leader Ariel Sharon was reelected, fending off a challenge from former prime minister and party leader Benjamin Netanyahu, as well as a lesser challenge from Moshe Feiglin.

Candidates
Moshe Feiglin, co-founder of the Manhigut movement
Benjamin Netanyahu, incumbent minister of foreign affairs, former prime minister (1996–1999), former Likud party leader (1993–1999)
Ariel Sharon, incumbent prime minister and Likud party leader

Campaign
The election was held ahead of the 2003 Israeli legislative election, a snap election that Sharon had called as prime minister. While Sharon enjoyed high approval among the general public, his move towards the political center had offput many in they party's right-wing base, making him appear vulnerable in the party's leadership election. Three hours after he announced the snap election, former prime minister and party leader Benjamin Netanyahu declared his candidacy for the leadership election.

Originally, Netanyahu stated that he planned to campaign on the economy. But he pivoted quickly to an all-out attack on Sharon's potential plans for pursuing a two-state solution. Sharon, on the other hand, campaigned, in part, by contrasting his broad electoral success in the 2001 Israeli prime ministerial election with Netanyahu's narrow 1996 victory and his broad 1999 loss.

Days before the vote, a poll of Likud members projected that Sharon would defeat Netanyahu by 16 or 18 percent.

Electorate
The leadership election was open to the party's general membership, which, at the time, numbered at 305,000.

Result

See also
2002 Israeli Labor Party leadership election

References

Likud leadership
Likud leadership elections
Likud
Likud leadership election
Ariel Sharon
Benjamin Netanyahu